Ludmila Kim (Liudmila Kim) is a Kazakhstani singer and VJ. She has been a member of pop-band "Duet L" in 1990s and was a jury member in SuperStar KZ 3, the Kazakh version of Pop Idol in 2006.

References 

Living people
20th-century Kazakhstani women singers
21st-century Kazakhstani women singers
Kazakhstani people of Korean descent
Koryo-saram
SuperStar KZ
Year of birth missing (living people)